Seo Ye-hwa is a South Korean actress and model. She is known for her roles in dramas such as Extracurricular (2020), Backstreet Rookie (2020) and Vincenzo (2021).

Biography and career
She was born on March 8, 1989, in Seoul, South Korea. She joined Namoo Actors and she made her debut as an actress in 2008. She appeared in drama Flower Grandpa Investigation Unit as Lee Soo-jung. After that she appeared in several dramas such as Vincenzo, Backstreet Rookie, Extracurricular and Her Private Life.

Filmography

Television series

Awards and nominations
 2020 SBS Drama Awards nominated for Best New Actress in Backstreet Rookie

References

External links
 
 

1989 births
Living people
21st-century South Korean actresses
South Korean female models
South Korean television actresses